Lydia Echevarría (born October 14, 1931) is a Puerto Rican actress who was convicted of plotting the murder of her husband, Puerto Rican television show producer, Luis Vigoreaux.

Early years

Echevarría met producer Luis Vigoreaux in 1960 during the presentation of a show called "La Hora Cero" (Zero Hour), which Vigoreaux produced with actor Mario Pabón. On February 10, 1960, after they were married, Echevarría joined her husband as co-host in the 1960s and 70s in the television shows Pa'rriba Papi Pa'rriba and Sube Nene Sube transmitted through WAPA-TV. Vigoreaux and Echevarría had two daughters, Vanessa and Glendaly Vigoreaux.

Films
Among the films and Novelas (soap operas) in which Echevarría has participated are the following:

Doña Ana (film) - as Dona Ana  (2003)
Life During Wartime (film) -  as Evangelina  (2009)
Novelas
Vivir para tí (TV series) - as Clara (1982)
Yo sé que mentía (TV series) - (1982)

Conviction
In 1982, Luis Vigoreaux allegedly began an affair with model Nydia Castillo, and in 1983, he was found burnt to death inside his car. Almost immediately, a large part of the public started pointing fingers at different people, and in 1984, Echevarría was formally accused of her husband's death. Her trial was one of the most sensational in Puerto Rican history, with a media circus atmosphere because of the celebrity status of the couple.

In 1986, she was found guilty and sentenced to 208 years in a women's prison in Vega Alta, Puerto Rico. However, her health deteriorated and in 1999, Governor Pedro Rosselló allowed her to leave jail to live at home under a curfew. In 2001, she resumed her acting career with the presentation of a play titled  (meaning, women prisoners) in the same prison where she served her time. Since then she has appeared in plays and some TV shows, on the condition that she be home by 8 p.m. every night. Glendaly Vigoreaux, the couple's eldest daughter, died by suicide in her Arizona residence on July 15, 2008, however, her lawyer, Fátima Seda Barletta, stated that she may have been murdered and that the investigation was incomplete.

See also

List of Puerto Ricans

References

1931 births
Puerto Rican people of Basque descent
Living people
Mariticides
Puerto Rican film actresses
People convicted of murder by Puerto Rico
Puerto Rican people convicted of murder
Puerto Rican telenovela actresses
20th-century Puerto Rican actresses
21st-century Puerto Rican actresses
1983 crimes in Puerto Rico